Walter S. Diehl may refer to:

Walter Stuart Diehl (1893-1976), an American naval officer and pioneer in aerodynamics and aeronautical design.
USNS Walter S. Diehl (T-AO-193), a United States Navy fleet replenishment oiler in service with the Military Sealift Command since 1988